The Lonesome Trail may refer to:

 The Lonesome Trail (1930 film), 1930 American western film directed by Bruce Mitchell
 The Lonesome Trail (1945 film), 1945 American western film directed by Oliver Drake
 The Lonesome Trail (1955 film), 1955 American western film directed by Richard Bartlett